Grasshopper Glacier may refer to:

Grasshopper Glacier (Montana), in the Beartooth Range
Grasshopper Glacier (Wyoming), in the Wind River Range